Hemilampronites is a prehistoric genus of flying fish. Its fossils can be found in Maastrichtian aged marine deposits.

Classification
Hemilampronites is a member of the order Beloniformes.

Species
Hemilampronites hesperius

Cretaceous bony fish
Prehistoric ray-finned fish genera
Exocoetidae